Jyothi Lakshmi (2 November 1948 – 9 August 2016) was an Indian actress who appeared in more than 130 movies. In the early 1970s, she was well noted for her leading roles and songs in movies. She also acted in female-oriented movies and was a trained dancer. She predominantly worked in Tamil,  Telugu, Kannada, and Malayalam movies. In the early 1980s, her popularity gradually declined due to her sister Jayamalini's entry into the movie industry. Her debut was in the film Vanambadi in 1963 as a dancer in the song 'Yaaradi Vanthaar'. She is best remembered for her supporting roles in Thedi Vandha Mapillai and Periya Edathu Penn.

Her daughter Jyothi Meena is also an actress.

Filmography

Tamil
Vanambadi (1963)
Periya Idathu Penn (1963)
Pattanathil Bhootham (1967)
Galatta Kalyanam (1968)
Poovum Pottum (1968)
Adimaippenn (1969)
Thalaivan (1970)
Thedi Vandha Mappillai (1970)
Vairakyam (1970)
Neerum Neruppum (1971)
Rickshawkaran (1971)
Yaar Jambulingam (1972)
Ragam Thedum Pallavi (1982)
Nayakan (1987)
Muthu (1995)
Dharma Chakkaram (1997)
Pasamulla Pandiyare (1997)
Vaimaye Vellum (1997)
Maru Malarchi (1998)
Sethu (1999)
Ennamma Kannu (2000)
Middle Class Madhavan (2001)
Annai Kaligambal (2003)
M. Kumaran S/O Mahalakshmi (2004)
Pachchak Kuthira (2006)
Sandai (2008)
Jaganmohini (2009)
Kozhi Koovuthu (2012)
Vasuvum Saravananum Onna Padichavanga (2015)
Trisha Illana Nayanthara (2015)
Kavalai Vendam (2016) - Last movie in Tamil

Telugu
 Punyavathi (1967)
 Thaali Bottu (1970) as Jyothi
 Mosagallaku Mosagadu (1971)
 Gandara Gandadu (1972)
 Pilla? Piduga? (1972)
 Korada Rani - played Title Role
 Ida Lokham (1973)
 Gandharvya Kanya (1979)
 Sita Ramulu (1980)
Kottapeta Rowdy (1980)
 Adrushtavanthudu (1980)
 Bebbuli (1980)
Dharma Poratam (1983) as Mohini
 Hero (1984)
 Babulugaadi Debba (1984)
 State Rowdy (1989)
 Big Boss (1995)
 Kalusukovalani (2002)
 Donga Ramudu & Party (2003)
 Bangaru Babu (2009)

Malayalam
 Murappennu (1965)
 Kunjali Marakkar (1967)
 Nagarame Nandi (1967)
 Inspector (1968)
 Kodungallooramma (1968)
 Alibabayum 41 Kallanmaarum (1975) as Dancer
 Manushyamrigam (1980)
 Bhaktha Hanuman (1980) as Dancer at Indra's court
 Thadavara (1981)
 Sanchari (1981)

Kannada
 Kulla Agent 000 (1965)
 Bangalore Mail (1966)
 Prathidhwani (1969)
 Chellida Raktha (1982)
 Raktha Kanneeru (2004)
 Vijaya Dashami (2001)

Hindi
 Payal Ki Jhankar (1968)
 Jawab (1970)
 Pistolwali (1972)
 Naag Mani (1987)

Serial

 2002-2004 Velan - Naagamma - (SUN TV) - Tamil
 2002-2005 Annamalai- Gandhimathi (SUN TV) - Tamil
 2005 Raja Rajeswari - Podakki (SUN TV) - Tamil
 2010 Vasantham - Kanagavalli - (SUN TV ) - Tamil
 2015-2016 Valli-Rajeswari  (Episode 822–1060) (SUN TV) - Tamil (2015-2016) Last serial

Death
She died in Chennai on 8 August 2016 due to blood cancer .

References

External links

Indian film actresses
Actresses in Malayalam cinema
Actresses in Tamil cinema
Actresses in Kannada cinema
Actresses in Telugu cinema
Place of birth missing
1948 births
2016 deaths
20th-century Indian actresses
21st-century Indian actresses
Actresses from Chennai
Indian television actresses
Actresses in Tamil television